John Henshall FRPS FRGS FBIPP (born John Mark Henshall, 6 January 1942) is a British professional photographer, cinematographer, and writer on the art and science of photography and digital imaging.

Career 
In 1985, Henshall was elected Fellow of the Royal Photographic Society, later serving on its council and as chairman of its Associateship and Fellowship distinctions panel for Film and Video. He also registered and founded the first RPS website in 1996.

Henshall founded Electronic Photo-Imaging and the EPI-centre in 1991.

Current work 
In December 2015 Henshall was elected honorary president of the Guild of Television Camera Professionals (GTC) formerly the Guild of Television Cameramen, a not-for-profit independent craft organisation of which he was a founder member in 1972.

Publications 
 1969. Sir H. George Fordham Carto-bibliographer. Map Collectors’ Series No 51. London: Map Collectors’ Circle.
 1969. Dealers in Coins: The Directory of Dealers in Coins & Medals in the British Isles. Richmond, Surrey, UK: Numismatic Directories. 
 1992. Photographic Qualifications for Professionals. 1st ed. Ware, Hertfordshire, UK: British Institute of Professional Photography. 
 1993–2006 inclusive. John Henshall's Chip Shop. Monthly articles in The Photographer magazine. Ware, Hertfordshire, UK: British Institute of Professional Photography. ISSN 0031-8698
 1997. Photographic Qualifications for Professionals. 2nd ed. Ware, Hertfordshire, UK: British Institute of Professional Photography. 
 2003. Going Digital Wedding and Portrait Photography. Rotovision.  Co-author with Joël Lacey.

Honours and awards 

 Master of Arts (MA) in honoris causa from the University for the Creative Arts (UCA) 30 June 2009.
 Oration speech at Guildford Cathedral

References

External links 
 
 John Henshall on ITV's This Morning 1994
 BBC feature – John Henshall takes relief to Sichuan, China, after earthquake 12 May 2008
 Interview BBC Radio Oxford Malcolm Boyden 4 March 2011
 Shapers of the 80s
 GTC's John Henshall draws celebrity crowd at NFT1
 GTC Vice President to present valuable archive tapes at Kaleidoscope
 John Henshall images at Alamy picture library
 Extended and comprehensive details about John Henshall

1942 births
Living people
Photographers from Cheshire
People from Stockport